Brindle is a surname. Notable people with the name include:

 Arran Brindle (born 1981), English cricketer, member of the England Women's team
 Dave Brindle, Canadian broadcast journalist and producer
 Frederick Brindle (born 1909), English professional rugby league footballer
 Melbourne Brindle (1904–1995), Australian-American illustrator and painter
 Reginald Brindle (1925–1998), English cricketer
 Reginald Smith Brindle (1917–2003), British composer and writer
 Robert Brindle (1837–1916), English prelate of the Roman Catholic Church
 Timothy Brindle (born 1980), American Christian hip hop musician
 Tom Brindle (disambiguation), multiple people, including:
Tom Brindle (footballer) (1861–1905), English footballer
Tom Brindle (politician) (1878–1950), member of the New Zealand Legislative Council
 Brindle, Brindle Family from Small Wonder